Settergren is a surname. Notable people with the surname include:

Arne Settergren (born 1935), Swedish sailor
Johan Settergren (born 1978), Swedish tennis player